The Yawkey Baseball League of Boston is one of the elite amateur baseball leagues in New England. Its franchises are composed of players from all levels of elite baseball backgrounds – current and former collegiate student athletes, along with former professional baseball players.  It is also named after former owner of the Boston Red Sox, and Baseball Hall of Famer, Tom Yawkey.  The YBL is a wooden bat baseball league.

The league objective is to always be inclusive and field top amateur baseball talent to satisfy the competitive nature of its players and provide a free entertainment option in the communities where games are played.

The YBL plays a competitive schedule that begins in May and ends in August with a championship series.  The YBL plays seven-inning games under Major League rules with some adaptation of NCAA requirements to ensure player safety.

The 2019 season saw the YBL once again take home the championship trophy of the Eastern Massachusetts Baseball Classic.  The Eastern Mass Classic annually pits All-Stars from the top four amateur baseball leagues (Park League, Intercity League and Cranberry League) in the Boston area against each other.  This was the YBL's 3rd title and 5th finals appearance, keeping a strong showing in the annual event.  The National Semi Pro Baseball Hall of Fame has inducted YBL members and the YBL also has played All-Star games at Fenway Park.  The league has also had many of its players be signed by professional baseball organizations.

The league has its roots in Boston back to the 1950s and was also known as the: City League, the Twilight League, and until 1990, the Boston Junior Park League. 1990 was a coming of age for the league, when it was renamed in honor of Mr. Yawkey.  The Yawkey Foundation is a major financial contributor. The league is very proud to continue the baseball tradition established by Tom and Jean Yawkey in Boston.

The Yawkey Baseball League, Inc. is a federally recognized 501(c)(3) public charity incorporated in the Commonwealth of Massachusetts.

2022 Board of Directors
 David J. McKay, President 
 Joseph O'Hara, Vice President/Treasurer
 David Treska, Secretary
 John Griffith, Member-at-Large
 Stephen Robb, Member-at-Large

2022 Team Franchises
 Al Thomas Athletics (Milton, MA), Al Thomas - Franchise Holder
 Brighton Black Sox (Brighton, MA), John Griffith - Franchise Holder
 Brighton Braves (Brighton, MA), Ted Tracy - Franchise Holder
 Somerville Alibrandis (Somerville, MA), David Treska - Franchise Holder
 McKay Club Beacons (Dorchester, MA), David McKay - Franchise Holder

Franchises inactive for the 2022 season:
 South End Astros (South End, Boston, MA), Owen Carlson - Franchise Holder

League Champions

Amateur baseball in the United States
Baseball leagues in Massachusetts
Baseball in Boston
Sports leagues established in 1990
1990 establishments in Massachusetts